Embellishment is a design element that adds interest to an object.

Embellishment may also refer to:
Ornament (music) 
Diving (ice hockey), also known as embellishment

Embellish may also refer to: 
Embellish (EP), an EP by The Jellyrox